Bhuvan Arora is an Indian actor who works in Hindi films and series. He has appeared in the television series The Test Case (2018) and Farzi (2023), with the latter emerging as his breakout role.

Career
Arora studied at the Film and Television Institute of India and began his acting career with small roles in the films Shuddh Desi Romance (2013), Tevar (2015) and Naam Shabana (2017). His role in the formermost, produced by Yash Raj Films, led him to a more prominent role in the company's comedy film Bank Chor (2017). He then played Rohan Rathore, a chauvinistic army aspirant, in the 2018 series The Test Case. Gayatri Gauri of Firstpost wrote that he "essays his role well without becoming a caricature". In 2020, he had a supporting role in the Netflix film Chaman Bahaar.

In 2023, Arora starred alongside Shahid Kapoor in the Amazon Prime Video crime drama series Farzi. Dishya Sharma of News18 found his "comic timing and dialogue delivery" to be "impressive". ThePrint's Nidhima Taneja found his to be the "breakout performance" of the series, adding that "the finesse in his performance, and his spot on Mumbaiya dialect, is a treat to watch".

Filmography

Film

Television

References

External links
 

Living people

Year of birth missing (living people)
Indian male television actors
Male actors in Hindi television
21st-century Indian male actors